Suwon Bus Terminal is the main intercity and express bus station serving Suwon, a city in South Korea's north-west province of Gyeonggi-do.  The station is located in Gwonseon-gu, 2.6km south-east of Suwon Station.  Standing beside a branch of E-Mart, it is not to be confused with West Suwon Bus Terminal, which is located adjacent to a different branch of the same store.

Buses

There are direct buses from Suwon Bus Terminal to the following places.

Surroundings
emart
megabox

Express
Daejeon; Gwangju; Jinju; Mokpo

Inter-city

Chungcheong
Buyeo; Cheonan; Cheongju; Chungju; Daejeon; Eumseong; Jecheon; Jincheon; Onyang (Asan); Songnisan; Taean

Gangwon-do
Cheorwon; Chuncheon; Gangneung; Hongcheon; Sokcho; Wonju

Gyeonggi-do
Ansan; Anjung; Anseong; Bupyeong; Dongducheon; Goyang; Icheon; Incheon; Joam (Hwaseong); Pyeongtaek; Siheung; Uijeongbu; Yangpyeong; Yeoju

Gyeongsang
Andong; Busan; Changwon; Daegu; Gimhae; Gumi; Pohang; Sangju; Uljin; Ulsan; Yeongju; Yangsan;

Jeolla
Gunsan; Jeonju; Mokpo

External links
 Bus Terminals in Gyeonggi-do
 Express Bus Lines Association

Buildings and structures in Suwon
Transport in Suwon
Bus stations in South Korea